Miller Memorial Airpark  is a public airport located one mile (1.6 km) southwest of Vale in Malheur County, Oregon, USA.

References

External links

Airports in Malheur County, Oregon
Vale, Oregon